Banque Commerciale du Maroc (BCM, "Commercial Bank of Morocco") was a bank founded in 1911, shortly ahead of the establishment of the French protectorate in Morocco. The bank was initially controlled by France's Banque Transatlantique, then from 1941 by the Crédit Industriel et Commercial, and from 1988 by Morocco's ONA Group. In 2004, it merged with Wafa bank to form Attijariwafa Bank.

History

The BCM was created in 1911 by the Banque Transatlantique together with its Tunisian subsidiary, the Banque de Tunisie. Its registered office was in Paris, initially at 10, rue de Mogador (later absorbed by the Galeries Lafayette), and from 1925 relocated to the Banque Transatlantique's head office at 17, Boulevard Haussmann. Its main office in Morocco was in Casablanca.

The BCM opened a branch in Tangier in 1913, and after World War I expanded to Rabat and Mazagan, then in the late 1920s in Marrakesh and Fez.

In 1941, BCM was acquired together with Banque Transatlantique and Banque de Tunisie by the Crédit Industriel et Commercial (CIC), which took advantage of the Vichy anti-Jewish legislation. That same year, Deutsche Bank acquired 10% of the BCM's equity capital.

In 1969, a further capital increase resulted in significantly higher Moroccan ownership of the BCM's shares. In June 1988, ONA Group acquired 25% of the BCM's equity through a capital increase and thus became its controlling shareholder, while the CIC reduced its stake to 10.6%.

By 1999, the capital of BCM was 1,325,000,000.00 Moroccan Dirhams for a total of 13,250,000 shares. In 2002, the capital of Wafabank was 639,482,700 Moroccan dirhams. The two banks announced their merger in November 2003 and completed it in 2004, in a friendly all-shares transactions at a parity of 7 BCM shares per 8 Wafabank.

Casablanca head office

In Casablanca, the BCM's head office relocated several times. In 1921, it moved to a building shared with the affiliated shipping company, the Compagnie Générale Transatlantique, on the newly traced , now , just north of the recently erected office of the State Bank of Morocco. Both these buildings, of the BCM and of the State Bank, have since been demolished.

In 1930, the BCM moved to a building designed by Marius Boyer on 1, now . The iconic art deco structure still exists, and was renovated in 2021.

In the 1970s, under the leadership of its charismatic president , the BCM built a modern inverted-pyramid-shaped head office at 2, Boulevard Moulay Youssef, near the Arab League Park. This became the headquarters of Attijariwafa Bank following the 2004 merger, and still is as of 2022.

See also 
 List of banks in Morocco

Notes

1911 establishments in Morocco
2004 disestablishments in Morocco
Banks established in 1911
Banks disestablished in 2004
Banks of Morocco
Defunct banks of Morocco
ONA Group